Aleksandr Belanovsky (born 3 May 1972) is a Belarusian gymnast. He competed in eight events at the 1996 Summer Olympics.

References

1972 births
Living people
Belarusian male artistic gymnasts
Olympic gymnasts of Belarus
Gymnasts at the 1996 Summer Olympics
Gymnasts from Minsk